These are lists of Brazilian state governors.

 List of current state governors in Brazil
 List of female state governors in Brazil
 List of Governors of Acre
 List of Governors of Amapá
 List of Governors of Amazonas
 List of Governors of Bahia
 List of Governors of Espírito Santo
 Governors of the Federal District (Brazil)
 List of Governors of Maranhão
 List of Governors of Mato Grosso do Sul
 List of Governors of Minas Gerais
 List of Governors of Paraná
 List of Governors of Rio de Janeiro
 List of Governors of Rondônia
 List of Governors of Roraima
 List of Governors of São Paulo
 List of Governors of Tocantins